Torben Hoffmann (born 27 October 1974) is a German former professional footballer who played as a defender.

Hoffmann works as a field reporter for Sky Sport News HD as a field reporter in Southern Germany and Austria.

Hoffmann is married with two daughters. The family resides in Munich.

References

External links
 

1974 births
Living people
Sportspeople from Kiel
German footballers
Footballers from Schleswig-Holstein
Association football defenders
Germany B international footballers
VfB Lübeck players
SC Freiburg players
Bayer 04 Leverkusen players
TSV 1860 Munich players
SpVgg Unterhaching players
Eintracht Frankfurt players
Bundesliga players
2. Bundesliga players
3. Liga players
German sports journalists
German male journalists
Mass media people from Bavaria